Saadiq Abdikadir Mohamed (born January 15, 1996) is a Somali footballer.

Early life
Mohamed was born in Nakuru, Kenya, in 1996 to a Somali mother. His father died when he was young, and he spent time in both Kenya and Somalia during his childhood. He played football in both countries, for Banadir in Somalia, and for A.F.C. Leopards in his native Kenya.

Club career
During his time in Somalia, he was targeted along with many others, by terrorist group Al-Shabaab, simply for playing football. After a surprise African youth championship qualification victory over Sudan, Mohamed gave a post-match interview in which he appeared to question Al-Shabaab, and asked for more peace in Somalia - to which he received numerous death threats. Two months before this game, a teammate of his had been killed, having been attacked after staying behind after training for extra practice with Mohamed.

After his interview, Mohamed moved back to Kenya, and signed with Kenyan Premier League side A.F.C. Leopards. While in Kenya, he was arrested several times - all without the police filing charges, to try and elicit bribe money from family members. Because of this, his contract with the Leopards was terminated.

Move to America
Having no club to play for, and no place to safely live without persecution, Mohamed travelled to the United States, where a friend had been granted asylum. His friend helped him compile a highlight reel for potential new clubs, and he jumped around the country trialling with various university sides. While staying in Texas, FC Dallas gave him a chance and he spent some time with their academy. Eventually the Saint Louis University offered him a place on their roster. During his time in America, he stayed with the sister of journalist J.R. Biersmith, who had been documenting Mohamed's struggle as a footballer under the Al-Shabaab regime.

University career
Mohamed had a very successful first year with the Saint Louis Billikens, earning an A-10 All-Rookie team selection, as well as twice earning A-10 Rookie of the Week honours. In his two years at Saint Louis University, Mohamed totalled twenty-two appearances and five goals.

During this time, J.R. Biersmith finished his documentary on Mohamed, titled Men in the Arena, and it was released in 2017. The documentary focused on Mohamed and fellow Somali footballer Sa'ad Hussein, and their struggles with playing football in a country ravaged by civil war.

In February 2018, the Saint Louis University reneged on their promise of a full scholarship for Mohamed, and so he decided to transfer to the Bradley University in Peoria, Illinois. He racked up twelve appearances in 2018 for the Braves, but was redshirted during the 2019 season, and only managed to feature in three games in his last season.

He graduated with honours in 2020, having been approved for asylum in the United States the previous year.

Career statistics

International

References

1996 births
Living people
Association football midfielders
Association football forwards
People with acquired Somali citizenship
Somalian footballers
Somalian expatriate footballers
Somalia international footballers
Somalian expatriates in the United States
Expatriate soccer players in the United States
Kenyan footballers
Saint Louis Billikens men's soccer players
Bradley Braves men's soccer players
People from Nakuru